Michael Hewson Crawford,  (born 7 December 1939) is a British ancient historian and numismatist. Having taught at Christ's College, Cambridge and the University of Cambridge, he was Professor of Ancient History at University College London from 1986 until he retired in 2005.

Early life

Crawford was born in Twickenham on 7 December 1939. He was educated at St Paul's School, Oriel College, Oxford (BA, MA), and the British School at Rome.

Academic career
In 1964, Crawford was elected a research fellow of Christ's College, Cambridge. From 1969 until 1986 he was Fellow of Christ's College, Cambridge, and University Lecturer in Ancient History in the University of Cambridge. He was Professor of Ancient History at University College London from 1986 until 2005, becoming emeritus professor on his retirement. He continued to undertake some teaching in the Department of History and works on Projet Volterra.

In 1964/65, Crawford was Eliza Procter Visiting Fellow at Princeton University. He has also been a visiting professor at University of Pavia (1983 and 1992), École Normale Supérieure (1984), University of Padua (1986), University of San Marino (1989), University of Milan (1990), University of L'Aquila (1990), École pratique des hautes études (1997), and École des hautes études en sciences sociales (1999).

Honours
He was elected a Fellow of the British Academy in 1980, a Foreign Member of the Istituto Lombardo in 1990 and a Foreign Corresponding Member of the Institut de France in 2006. In 2001 he was appointed an Officier de l'Ordre des Palmes Académiques de la République Française. He was awarded the medal of the Royal Numismatic Society in 1984 and is also a member of the Italian Numismatic Society.

Publications 

 T.J. Cornell, M.H. Crawford, and J.A. North, Art and production in the world of the Caesars (Milan: Olivetti, 1987)
 Michael H. Crawford, ed., L'Impero romano e le strutture economiche e sociali delle provincie (Como: Edizioni New Press, 1986)
 Michael H. Crawford, Coinage and money under the Roman Republic: Italy and the Mediterranean economy (London: Methuen, 1985)
 M.H. Crawford, A catalogue of Roman Republican coins in the collections of the Royal Scottish Museum, Edinburgh (Edinburgh: Royal Scottish Museum, 1984)
 Michael Crawford and David Whitehead, Archaic and Classical Greece: a selection of ancient sources in translation (Cambridge; New York: Cambridge University Press, 1983)
 Michael Crawford, ed., Sources for ancient history (Cambridge: Cambridge University Press, 1983)
 Michael H. Crawford, La moneta in Grecia e a Roma (Bari: Laterza, 1982)
 Michael Crawford, 'Economia imperiale e commercio estero', Tecnologia, economia e società nel mondo romano: Atti del Convegno di Como, 27–29 sett. 1979 (1980), 207–218
 Michael H. Crawford, 'Ancient Devaluations: a general theory', Collection de l'École française de Rome 37 (1978) Les "dévaluations" à Rome. Epoque républicaine et impériale (Rome, 13–15 Nov 1975), 147–158
 Michael H. Crawford, Roman Republican coinage (London: Cambridge University Press, 1974)
 Mark Hassall, Michael Crawford, and Joyce Reynolds, 'Rome and the eastern provinces at the end of the second century B.C.', Journal of Roman Studies 64 (1974), 195–220
 K.T. Erim, J. Reynolds, and M. Crawford, 'Diocletian's currency reform: a new inscription', Journal of Roman Studies 61 (1971), 171–177
 Michael Crawford, Coin hoards and the pattern of violence in the late Republic (London: R. Clay & Sons, 1969)
 M.H. Crawford, The financial organisation of Republican Spain, Numismatic Chronicle 9 (1969), 79–93
 Michael H. Crawford, Roman Republican coin hoards (London: Royal Numismatic Society, 1969)
 Michael H. Crawford, 'The edict of M. Marius Gratidianus', Proceedings of the Cambridge Philological Society (1968), 1–4
 M.H. Crawford, 'War and finance', Journal of Roman Studies 54 (1964), 29–32

References

External links 

 Debrett's People of Today
  
 

1939 births
Living people
People associated with the History Department, University College London
Historians from Twickenham
English numismatists
English classical scholars
Alumni of Oriel College, Oxford
People educated at St Paul's School, London
Fellows of Christ's College, Cambridge
Fellows of the British Academy
Members of the Society for the Promotion of Hellenic Studies
Officiers of the Ordre des Palmes Académiques
Members of the University of Cambridge faculty of classics
Classical scholars of the University of London
Historians of ancient Rome
Contributors to the Oxford Classical Dictionary